American Fantasy Press is a science fiction/fantasy/horror specialty press owned and operated by Robert T. Garcia and Nancy Garcia. Located in Woodstock, Illinois, the press has published: The first U.S. hardcover edition of Dennis Etchison's Darkside (A 10th anniversary edition); the chapbook edition of The Man on the Ceiling by Steve Rasnic and Melanie Tem, the chapbook of A Walking Tour of the Shambles by Neil Gaiman and Gene Wolfe, the first U.S. hardcover edition of Michael Moorcock's The Dreamthief's Daughter (a signed, limited edition), the chapbook The Broecker Sampler, featuring the artwork of Randy Broecker, a broadsheet of Jo Fletcher's poem Midnight Monster illustrated by Gahan Wilson, and the first hardcover edition of the Mary Frances Zambreno's short story collection Invisible Pleasures.  It published the fantasy short story collection by Mike Resnick, Stalking the Zombie which features his hard-boiled detective John J. Mallory in an alternate Manhattan. In 2015, the press published The Collectors' Book of Virgil Finlay, by Robert Weinberg, Douglas Ellis and AF publisher Robert Garcia.

The press began as an offshoot of the Garcia's magazine American Fantasy, which won a World Fantasy Special Award—Non-professional in 1988. The Man on the Ceiling won the World Fantasy Award, The International Horror Guild Award and the Bram Stoker Award.

External links
American Fantasy Press

Book publishing companies based in Illinois
Companies based in McHenry County, Illinois